Edward F. Harris (1909 – September 19, 1983) was an American politician in the state of Washington. He served in the Washington House of Representatives.

References

1909 births
1983 deaths
Republican Party members of the Washington House of Representatives